David Corceiro (born 3 August 1977 is a French politician who has been Member of Parliament for Val-d'Oise's 6th constituency since 2020.

References 

Living people
1977 births
People from Saint-Denis, Seine-Saint-Denis

Democratic Movement (France) politicians
Deputies of the 15th National Assembly of the French Fifth Republic
21st-century French politicians
Members of Parliament for Val-d'Oise